was a Japanese mathematician who introduced the notion of Azumaya algebra in 1951.  His advisor was Shokichi Iyanaga. At the time of his death he was an emeritus professor at Indiana University.

References

External links

 
 Biography of Azumaya by BiRep, Bielefeld University 

1920 births
20th-century Japanese mathematicians
21st-century Japanese mathematicians
Algebraists
Indiana University faculty
2010 deaths
Nagoya University alumni
Japanese expatriates in the United States